The NWA Central States Heavyweight Championship was a professional wrestling championship that served as the main title for the National Wrestling Alliance promotion, NWA Central-States Championship Wrestling. For most of its existence, however, the title was defended in the NWA affiliate Central States Wrestling from 1950 to 1989.

Title history

See also
List of National Wrestling Alliance championships

Footnotes

References
General sources for the original Central States Championship
 (through 2000)

Specific

Heart of America Sports Attractions championships
National Wrestling Alliance championships
Heavyweight wrestling championships
Regional professional wrestling championships